The molecular formula C20H24N2OS (molar mass: 340.48 g/mol, exact mass: 340.1609 u) may refer to:

 Cinanserin
 Lucanthone
 Propiomazine

Molecular formulas